On 7 January 2022 (Orthodox Christmas), the Ethiopian Air Force carried out an airstrike on a camp for internally displaced people in the town of Dedebit, in the Tigray Region of Ethiopia. According to aid workers and the Tigray People's Liberation Front, between 56 and 59 people were killed and at least 30 others were injured. Most of the victims were reported to have been hiding in a camp set up inside a school at the time of the attack.

Background 
The airstrike occurred in the context of a wider campaign of airstrikes and bombardments of Tigrayan settlements, which left 108 people dead overall. In particular, it happened during an interim period between the TPLF's withdrawal of troops from the Amhara and Afar Regions on 20 December 2021, and the beginning of a 5-month ceasefire on 24 March 2022.

In response to the Tigrayan withdrawal, the Ethiopian federal government made reassurances that the ENDF would not advance further into Tigray than they already had, as, according to Government Communication Service minister Legesse Tulu, "the [TPLF]’s desire and ability [to engage in war] is severely destroyed." The federal government publicly expressed a desire for peace, with Ethiopian Prime Minister Abiy Ahmed stating he was looking for an "all-inclusive national dialogue." On the same day as the airstrike, Ethiopia also released a number of political prisoners, some of them being from the TPLF.

It was later revealed that the Ethiopian military may have bought the drones from Turkey, as the drones used were Baykar Bayraktar TB2.

Investigations 
On 24 March 2022, Human Rights Watch requested the Ethiopian government to investigate the airstrike, describing it as a war crime. UN investigators came to a similar conclusion in September 2022, stating that they had "reasonable grounds to believe that the Ethiopian Air Force committed war crimes," among them being the airstrike on Dedebit.

References

2022 airstrikes
2022 in Ethiopia
Airstrikes during the Tigray War
Ethiopian Air Force
Ethiopia–Turkey relations
January 2022 events in Africa
2022 massacres of the Tigray War
Attacks on schools in Africa